Nola cereella, the sorghum webworm, is a moth of the family Nolidae. It is kin to the Noctuidae, also called Tuft moth due to the presence of its tufted scales. The species was first described by Louis Augustin Guillaume Bosc in 1800. It is found in the southeastern parts of the United States, from Texas to Florida, and north to New York. From North America its range extends southward through Puerto Rico and Suriname down to Argentina.

The wingspan is 12–18 mm. Adults are on wing from July to September depending on the location.

The larvae feed on Sorghum vulgare.

References

External links

cereella
Moths of North America
Noctuoidea of South America
Moths of the Caribbean
Insects of Mexico
Moths described in 1800